Ras homolog gene family, member B, also known as RHOB, is a protein which in humans is encoded by the RHOB gene.

RHOB is a member of the Rho GTP-binding protein family.

Interactions 

RHOB has been shown to interact with CIT, ARHGEF3, ARHGDIG and RHPN2.

See also 
 neural crest

References

Further reading